Centnerszwer is a Polish surname. Notable people with the surname include:

  (1798–1880), Polish mathematician
 Mieczysław Centnerszwer (1874–1944), Polish chemist

Polish-language surnames